The 1992 Idaho Vandals football team represented the University of Idaho in the 1992 NCAA Division I-AA football season. The Vandals, led by fourth-year head coach John L. Smith, were members of the Big Sky Conference and played their home games at the Kibbie Dome, an indoor facility on campus in Moscow, Idaho.

Regular season
Led by junior quarterback Doug Nussmeier, Idaho finished the regular season at 9–2 and 6–1 in the Big Sky. The Vandals were co-champions with Eastern Washington, whom they defeated 38–21 in Cheney in mid-October. Idaho began the season at ninth in the I-AA rankings, and won its first six games, including a win at Division I-A Colorado State of the WAC. After the win at EWU, they climbed to second in the rankings.

Five days later, Idaho lost by one point at top-ranked Northern Iowa, then lost the Little Brown Stein at home to unranked Montana two weeks later. In the regular season finale with rival Boise State, the Vandals won for the eleventh consecutive year, for their sixth straight victory at Bronco Stadium.

This is Idaho's most recent Big Sky football title. They moved up to Division I-A in 1996, but are scheduled to return to the conference for football in 2018.

Division I-AA playoffs
After missing the postseason the previous year for the first time since 1984, the Vandals returned to the 16-team I-AA playoffs and were ranked fifth in the regular season's final poll. They hosted in the first round, but lost to #11 McNeese State of Louisiana.

Notable players and coaches
Junior quarterback Nussmeier, a four-year starter (1990–93), was the conference offensive player of the year, an All-American, and won the Walter Payton Award in 1993. He was selected by the New Orleans Saints in the 1994 NFL Draft and played several seasons as a reserve prior to starting his career as a coach. Also a four-year starter, senior defensive end Jeff Robinson was an All-American and a two-time Big Sky defensive player of the year. Selected by the Denver Broncos in the fourth round of the 1993 NFL Draft, Robinson was later a tight end and played in the NFL through , extending his career as a long snapper. He was a member of the St. Louis Rams for Super Bowls XXXIV and XXXVI. Junior placekicker Mike Hollis, a junior college transfer, had a seven-year career in the NFL, which included a Pro Bowl.

Former Vandal quarterback Scott Linehan, a future NFL head coach, was the offensive coordinator and two future Vandal head coaches were on the staff: Nick Holt (defensive line) and Paul Petrino (receivers).

With the win over Boise State, Smith became the winningest head coach in school history at 33–14, passing his former boss Dennis Erickson. He stayed another two seasons and remains the Vandals' all-time leader with 53 wins, followed by Erickson at 36 (an additional season in 2006), and Chris Tormey at 33.

Schedule

NFL Draft
One Vandal senior was selected in the 1993 NFL Draft, which was eight rounds (224 selections).

One Vandal junior was selected in the following year's draft in 1994, which was seven rounds (222 selections).

List of Idaho Vandals in the NFL Draft

References

External links
Gem of the Mountains: 1993 University of Idaho yearbook – 1992 football season
Idaho Argonaut – student newspaper – 1992 editions

Idaho
Idaho Vandals football seasons
Big Sky Conference football champion seasons
Idaho Vandals football